First Methodist Episcopal Church of Parksville, also known as Parksville United Methodist Church, is a historic Methodist Episcopal church at 10 Short Avenue in Parksville, Sullivan County, New York.  It was built in 1898 and is a small, "L" shaped, wood-frame building with clapboard siding.  It features an entrance tower surmounted by a small spire.  Also on the property is the Parksville cemetery.

It was added to the National Register of Historic Places in 2001.

References

Methodist churches in New York (state)
Churches on the National Register of Historic Places in New York (state)
Churches completed in 1898
19th-century Methodist church buildings in the United States
Churches in Sullivan County, New York
1898 establishments in New York (state)
National Register of Historic Places in Sullivan County, New York